The 1960 Orange Bowl was the 26th edition of the college football bowl game, played at the Orange Bowl in Miami, Florida, on Friday, January 1. Part of the 1959–60 bowl game season, the fifth-ranked Georgia Bulldogs of the Southeastern Conference (SEC) shut out the #18 Missouri Tigers of the Big Eight Conference, 14–0.

Teams

Missouri

Missouri was the runner-up in the Big Eight Conference, selected to play in this game over Oklahoma due to the conference's new (and short-lived) rule against consecutive bowl appearances; the Sooners had won the previous two Orange Bowls. The Tigers had four losses in the regular season.

Georgia

Georgia was champion of the Southeastern Conference for the first time in eleven years, and made their first bowl appearance since 1950. Their only loss was in early October at South Carolina.

Game summary
Georgia quarterback Fran Tarkenton threw a 29-yard pass to Bill McKenny to give the Bulldogs a  lead in the first. In the second quarter, he scrambled and threw a touchdown pass of 33 yards to Aaron Box to make it  at halftime, and the second half was scoreless. The Missouri offense outgained the Bulldogs in yards, but could not reach the end zone due to three interceptions. Tarkenton threw nine-of-16 passes for 131 yards.

Aftermath
Missouri won the Orange Bowl the next year. Georgia's next major bowl was seven years later, when they won the Cotton Bowl.

The Bulldogs did not return to the Orange Bowl until December 31, 2021.  They were ranked No. 3 and faced No. 2 Michigan in the 2021 College Football Playoff Semifinal, winning 34–11.

This was the only meeting between the two programs until Missouri joined the SEC in 2012 and was slotted in the Eastern Division.

Statistics
{| class=wikitable style="text-align:center"
! Statistics !! Georgia  !! Missouri
|-
|First downs||14||17
|-
|Rushing yards||88||80
|-
|Passing yards||128||180
|-
|Total offense||216||260
|-
|Interceptions||2||3
|-
|Punts–Average	||7–46.9||6–38.7
|-
|Fumbles–Lost 	||1–0||3–0
|-
|Penalties–Yards||7–44||7–72
|}

References

Orange Bowl
Orange Bowl
Georgia Bulldogs football bowl games
Missouri Tigers football bowl games
January 1960 sports events in the United States
Orange Bowl